Beckendorfer Mühlenbach is a small river of North Rhine-Westphalia, Germany. It flows into the Schwarzbach near Bielefeld.

Geography and History 
The body of water has a total length of 6.3 km.  The catchment area extends over a small section of the Ravensberger Mulde in the north of Bielefeld, south of Spenge and east of Werther.

Upper Reaches 
The Beckendorfer Mühlenbach has its source in a spring pond at Nagelsholz, north of Jöllenbeck, around 750 m west of the Nagelsholz/Schlottkamp street corner and 500 m north of the Jöllenbeck windmill. The source area is part of the Beckendorfer Mühlenbachtal nature reserve, which accompanies the stream to its mouth. The stream flows about 1.2 km south-west through an alluvial forest, marking the border between Bielefeld and Spenge for about 300 m. The stream turns south here and forms the border between Bielefeld and Werther for more than 1 km. It passes an elongated building rubble dump to the west. From here the creek flows mainly through a kastenf typical of the Ravensberg hill country.

Middle Course 
The middle course turns towards the southeast direction. It travels 700 m towards the south-east direction. The Dreeker Bach or Preckerbach flows in from the left, which has its source on the Dreeker Weg in Jöllenbeck. Most of this side valley is part of the nature reserve. It travels another 700 m to the south-east. It crosses under the Beckendorfstraße between Jöllenbeck and Schröttinghausen. After 400 m further south-east, the Pfarrholzbach flows in from the left, which has its source at the Breede in Jöllenbeck. At the mouth there was a mill, which is still being used as a dwelling. Another 500 m further south, below the Heidsieker Heide road, is a hotel building that can be seen from afar. Another unnamed stream flows in from the right. Another 400 m further south, the Horstheider Bach flows in from the left, which has its source at the northern end of Theesen.

Below Reaches 
The approximately 1 km long lower course moves with a few curves in a narrow alluvial forest almost in a north–south direction, which separates Theesen from Babenhausen. Shortly before it flows into the Schwarzbach, the Beckendorfer Mühlenbach passes under the hiking trail that leads from the Köckerhof to the other Hof Meyer to Müdehorst on the Schröttinghauser Street.

Environment 
Large parts of the creek valley are under natural protection. The Beckendorfer Mühlenbachtal nature reserve is managed by the Gütersloh/Bielefeld Biological Station and serves, among other things, to "protect the largely contiguous valley areas of the Beckendorfer Mühlenbach from the source to the confluence with the Schwarzbach and the Seitensieke".

Fauna 
The nature reserve is known for the occurrence of the kingfisher, the woodpecker and the crested newt.

See also
List of rivers of North Rhine-Westphalia

References

Rivers of North Rhine-Westphalia
Rivers of Germany